United Shades of America is a Cable News Network (CNN) American documentary television series starring comedian W. Kamau Bell. Bell visits communities across America to understand the challenges they face. The show was named Outstanding Unstructured Reality Program at the 69th, 70th, and 71st Emmy Awards.

The first season premiered in 2016. A second season with eight new episodes aired in 2017. The third season began on April 29, 2018. On April 3, 2019, it was announced that the series was renewed for a fourth season which premiered on April 22, 2019. On June 30, 2020, it was announced that the fifth season would premiere on July 19, 2020. On April 1, 2021, CNN announced the sixth season would premiere on May 2, 2021.

Episodes

Season 1 (2016)

Season 2 (2017)

Season 3 (2018)

Season 4 (2019)

Season 5 (2020)

Season 6 (2021)

Season 7 (2022)

References

External links

2016 American television series debuts
2010s American television news shows
English-language television shows
CNN original programming
Primetime Emmy Award for Outstanding Reality Program winners